Phalonidia claudia is a species of moth of the family Tortricidae. It is found in Venezuela.

The wingspan is about 26 mm. The ground colour of the forewings is white cream, sprinkled and partially suffused with brownish. The markings are pale brown. The hindwings are white cream.

Etymology
The species name refers to the asymmetry of the sacculus and is derived from Latin claudia (meaning lame).

References

Moths described in 2006
Phalonidia